"Ven Por Mí" (English: Come For Me) was the first official single from Edurne's Second studio album "Ilusión". It was a cover of the Sita song which was originally released in 2003 under the name "Come With Me".

Track listing
 "Ven Por Mí" (Electrico Club Mix) - 6:58
 "Ven Por Mí" (Electrico Radio Mix) - 4:37
 "Ven Por Mí" (Radio Edit) - 3:56

Charts

Notes

External links
"No Quiero Más" Live in Can Zam 2007
"No Quiero Más" Live in OT TV Show by Telecinco

Edurne songs
Spanish songs
Spanish-language songs
2003 songs